Calophyllum inophyllum is a large evergreen plant, commonly called tamanu, oil-nut, mastwood, beach calophyllum or beautyleaf. It is native to tropical Asia and Wallacea. Due to its importance as a source of timber for the traditional shipbuilding of large outrigger ships, it has been spread in prehistoric times by the migrations of the Austronesian peoples to the islands of Oceania and Madagascar, along with other members of the genus Calophyllum. It has since been naturalized in regions in the East African coast. It is also a source of the culturally important tamanu oil.

Names
Calophyllum inophyllum is also known as Alexandrian laurel balltree, beach touriga, Borneo-mahogany, Indian doomba oiltree, Indian-laurel, laurelwood, red poon, satin touriga, and tacamahac-tree. In Island Southeast Asia and Oceania, they are also commonly known as bintangur, bitaog, tamanu, or kamani. In India it is known as Polanga (ପୋଲାଙ୍ଗ) in Odia, Punnag (पुन्नाग) in Marathi and Punnai in Tamil languages.

Description

Tree and leaves 
Calophyllum inophyllum is a low-branching and slow-growing tree, it spreads with a broad and irregular crown. It usually reaches  in height.

Flowers 
Flowering can occur perennially, but usually two distinct flowering periods are observed twice a year, in late spring from April to June and in late autumn from October to December. It has a sweet fragrance which attracts many insects to pollinate it.

Fruit 
When ripe, the fruit is wrinkled and its color varies from yellow to brownish-red.

Distribution and habitat
Calophyllum inophyllum is native to Africa in: Comoros; Kenya; Madagascar; Mauritius; Mozambique; Seychelles; Tanzania (including  Pemba Island of the Zanzibar Archipelago); south, southeast and east Asia in: Bangladesh; Cambodia; China (on Hainan); southern India; Andaman and Nicobar Islands Indonesia; Japan (Ryukyu Islands); Malaysia; Myanmar; Papua New Guinea; the Philippines; Sri Lanka; Taiwan; Thailand; Vietnam; the northwestern, southwestern and south central Pacific Region in: the Cook Islands; Fiji; French Polynesia (Marquesas and Society Islands); Guam; the Marshall Islands; Micronesia; the Northern Mariana Islands; Palau; and Samoa; and in Australia in: Northern Territory and Queensland.

 

Now, it is widely cultivated in all tropical regions of the world. Because of its decorative leaves, fragrant flowers, and spreading crown, it is best known as an ornamental plant.

This tree often grows in coastal regions, as well as nearby lowland forests. However, it has also been cultivated successfully in inland areas at moderate altitudes. It tolerates varied kinds of soil, coastal sand, clay, or even degraded soil.

Uses

Shipbuilding
Mastwood is notable for its ability to grow to massive sizes in sandy or rocky beaches of island and coastal habitats, as well as its habit of sending out arching large trunks over the water where its seeds are dispersed via the currents.  Due to these characters, mastwood are of particular importance to traditional shipbuilding of the larger Austronesian outrigger ships and were carried with them as they migrated to Oceania and Madagascar. Other species of the genus Calophyllum were also used similarly, like Calophyllum soulattri, Calophyllum peekelii, and Calophyllum goniocarpum. They were comparable in importance to how oaks were in European shipbuilding and timber industries.

Various parts of the mastwood were integral to the manufacture of outrigger canoes among various Austronesian peoples. The large curving limbs were commonly carved into the dugout canoe that formed the keel of the Austronesian outriggers ships. The strakes, which are attached to the keel by the uniquely Austronesian technique of "sewing" them with a combination of dowels and lashed lugs instead of nails, can also be made from mastwood, but it is more commonly made from other "softer" timber species like Artocarpus. Other pieces became masts, outrigger floats, and outrigger spars. Smaller curving limbs can also be carved into the ribs of the boat.

In many parts of Polynesia, mastwood groves planted in marae were considered sacred and abodes of spirits. Mastwood were also carved into religious objects like tiki. They are also commonly mentioned in the chants and folklore of Polynesia.

In Australia, the 1889 book The Useful Native Plants of Australia records "During a debate on the Pearl Fisheries Bill in the Queensland Assembly, a clause was specially inserted to protect trees of this species at Thursday Island. A fine of £10 is inflicted on any person who cuts down or injures this or a cocoa-nut tree, or any other tree bearing edible fruit. This clause is, of course, in the interest of the aboriginals.".

Other uses
Aside from shipbuilding, tamanu oil extracted from the fruit kernels were important in Polynesian culture. The oils, as well as poultices made from leaves and flowers, are also commonly used for traditional medicine. The leaves contain compounds that are poisonous to fish and can be used as fish poison. The sap of the tree is poisonous and is used to make poison arrows in Samoa. The mature fruit is poisonous enough to use as rat bait.

The seeds yield a thick, dark green tamanu oil for medicinal use or hair grease. The nuts are dried before cracking, after which the oil-laden kernel is removed and further dried. The first neoflavone isolated from natural sources (1951) was calophyllolide from C. inophyllum seeds.

The Mavilan, a Tulu-speaking tribe in north Kerala in India, use the bark to make a powder that they mix with water and apply it to plants affected by a type of plant disease caused by water that they call neeru vembu.

The fatty acid methyl esters derived from C. inophyllum seed oil meets the major biodiesel requirements in the United States (ASTM D 6751), and European Union (EN 14214).  The average oil yield is 11.7 kg-oil/tree or 4680 kg-oil/hectare.  In the northwest coastal areas of Luzon island in Philippines, the oil was used for night lamps.  This widespread use started to decline when kerosene became available, and later on electricity.  It was also used as fuel to generate electricity to provide power for radios during World War II.

See also
Domesticated plants and animals of Austronesia

References

External links

inophyllum
Flora of tropical Asia
Flora of the Pacific
Trees of Australia
Trees of China
Flora of the Western Indian Ocean
Trees of Japan
Flora of Kenya
Flora of Mozambique
Flora of the Northern Territory
Flora of Queensland
Flora of the Ryukyu Islands
Trees of Taiwan
Flora of Tanzania
Flora of the Zanzibar Archipelago
Malpighiales of Australia
Plants described in 1753
Taxa named by Carl Linnaeus
Least concern biota of Asia
Least concern flora of Oceania
Least concern flora of Australia
Least concern biota of Queensland
Ornamental trees
Flora of the Coral Sea Islands Territory